is a Japanese professional footballer who plays as a goalkeeper for V-Varen Nagasaki.

References

External links

1993 births
Living people
Japanese footballers
Association football goalkeepers
V-Varen Nagasaki players
J1 League players
J2 League players